Dimitar Panov (July 18, 1902 – November 15, 1985) was a Bulgarian film and theater actor and director.

Biography and career

Panov was born on July 18, 1902 in  the town of Veliko Tarnovo, Bulgaria. He made his debut in 1955 on the stage of the Plovdiv Theater in Chehov's play Five Small Comedies. He continued to work with this theater, not only as an actor, but also as a director of such plays as Sluzhbogontsi by the eminent Bulgarian writer Ivan Vazov.

At the same time Dimitar Panov collaborated with the Plovdiv Opera where he took part in the operetta "The Bat" by Strauss and in the opera "The Beautiful Helen" by Offenbach.

His cinematic debut was in 1960 in the film The Road Is Going Through Belovir, written by Pavel Vezhinov and directed by Petar B. Vasilev. In the film we can see Apostol Karamitev in the leading role of the engineer Petrov.

His autobiography The Life is Only One was published in 1983.

Panov died in 1985 at the age of 83.

Filmography

References
Bulgarian National Film Archive 
BG movies info

External links
 

1902 births
1985 deaths
Male actors from Sofia
People from Veliko Tarnovo
20th-century Bulgarian male actors
Bulgarian male stage actors
Bulgarian male film actors
Bulgarian autobiographers